Australia SailGP Team is an Australian sailing team which participates in the SailGP international sailing competition.

History 
Australia SailGP Team was established in 2019 by F50 League LLC as a part of the inaugural season of the SailGP competition.

It won the league's inaugural 2019 season as well as the subsequent 2021-22 season.

Team 
Australia SailGP Team is headed by skipper Tom Slingsby, who also serves as the team's chief executive officer.

References

External links 

 

2019 establishments in Australia
Sailing in Australia
Sailing teams